Rakhwala is a 1989 Indian Hindi-language film starring Anil Kapoor, Farha Naaz and Suresh Oberoi. The film was produced by D. Rama Naidu and directed by K. Murali Mohana Rao. Rakhwala is a remake of the 1987 Tamil film Michael Raj which was remade in Telugu in 1988 as Brahma Putrudu. D. Rama Naidu produced all the three versions.

Cast

 Anil Kapoor as Vikram Bose
 Farha Naaz as Ramtaki
 Suresh Oberoi as Ranjeet
 Shabana Azmi as Journalist Kiran
Tanuja as Janaki Bose, Vikram's Mother
 Prem Chopra as Jhingania Bose, Vikram's Father
 Shakti Kapoor as Inspector Dharam Raj
 Asrani as Sub Inspector Jamail Singh
 Annu Kapoor as Constable Atmaram 
 Beena Banerjee as Ranjeet's wife
 Sharat Saxena as Savouries Store Owner
 Ketki Dave as Constable Geeta
 Ajit Vachani as Mr. Chinoy
 Master Rinku as Young Vikram 
Baby shalini as Mini 
 A K Hangal as Kiran Father
 Neelam Mehra as Menaka, Jhinghania Assistant
Renu Joshi as Ranjeet Mother

Soundtrack 
Lyrics: Sameer

References

1989 films
1980s Hindi-language films
Hindi remakes of Tamil films
Films scored by Anand–Milind